Romanian railway services is an index page of all the rail services operated in Romania.
Railway services in Romania are operated by the following operators (see also rail transport operators in Romania):
Căile Ferate Române
Regiotrans
Regional (Via Terra Spedition)
Transferoviar Grup
Servtrans

Passenger services
CFR operates several different passenger services as compared to other private operators which only offer slow train and medium speed train operations (ex. Regiotrans, Regional). CFR had the following operating classes for passenger services until 11 December 2011, when the newly harmonised European classifications of trains came into order:
 EuroNight (EN) - numbered as IC trains from 500 to 599
 EuroCity (EC) - numbered as IC trains from 500 to 599
 InterCity (IC) - numbered from 500 to 599
 Rapid (R) - numbered from 200 to 499, from 600 to 999 and from 10000 to 14999
 Accelerat (A) - numbered from 1000 to 1999
 Personal (P) - numbered from 2000 to 9999
Post 11 December 2011, there are 3 main classes of trains with several technical variations in classification:
 Intercity (IC)
 Intercity Night
 EuroCity
 EuroCity Night
 InterRegio (IR)
 InterRegio Night
 Regio (R)
 Regio Express
 Regio Urban
 Regio Suburban

EuroCity (EC) and EuroNight (EN) are international trains which are usually run by CFR in partnership with another national carrier, depending on the origin and destination of the route.

Intercity services

Căile Ferate Române
Rail transport in Romania